Seidel is a surname of German origin.

Geographical distribution
As of 2014, 75.2% of all known bearers of the surname Seidel were residents of Germany (frequency 1:1,150), 13.2% of the United States (1:29,401), 3.8% of Brazil (1:58,599) and 1.2% of Poland (1:34,522).

In Germany, the frequency of the surname was higher than national average (1:1,150) in the following states:
 Saxony (1:258)
 Thuringia (1:559)
 Bremen (1:668)
 Saxony-Anhalt (1:671)
 Brandenburg (1:705)
 Mecklenburg-Vorpommern (1:1,058)

List of people surnamed Seidel
Alex Seidel (1909-1989), German firearm manufacturer and businessman
Andreas Seidel-Morgenstern (born 1956), German process engineer
Anna Seidel (1938-1991), German sinologist
Anna Seidel (speed skater), German short track skater
Bastian Seidel (born 1975), Australian politician and medical doctor
Christian Seidel, German author and film producer
Christiane Seidel (born 1988), American-born German-Danish actress
Doreen Seidel (born 1985), German model and racing driver
Ed Seidel (born 1957), computer scientist and physicist
Edmund Seidel (born 1878), socialist New York state senator
Emil Seidel (1864-1947), Socialist Mayor of Milwaukee
Erich Seidel, German slalom canoeist
Erik Seidel (born 1959), American poker player
Franz Schweigger-Seidel
Frederick Seidel (born 1936), American poet
Fynn Seidel (born 2004), German footballer
Guenter Seidel (born 1960), American equestrian
Hanns Seidel (1901-1961), German politician
Heinrich Seidel (1842–1906), German engineer and writer
Heinz Seidel
Hillel Seidel
Ina Seidel (1885–1974), German poet and author
Jan Seidel
Janet Seidel (1955–2017), American jazz singer
Jed Seidel, American television producer and screenwriter
Jen Seidel, American professional body painter
Kathleen Seidel, American autism blogger
Lavon Seidel-Volsky (born 1965), Belarusian musician
Leon Seidel (born 1996), German actor
Lindsay Seidel, American voice actress
Mike Seidel (born 1957), American meteorologist
Molly Seidel (born 1994), American long-distance runner
Paul Seidel
Paul Seidel (cyclist)
Philipp Ludwig von Seidel (1821–1896), German mathematician, optician and astronomer
Raimund Seidel, a German and Austrian computer scientist
Silvia Seidel (1969-2012), German actress
Slava Seidel (born 1974), German artist
Sören Seidel (born 1972), German football manager
Sven Seidel (born 1973/74), former CEO of Lidl
Toscha Seidel (1899–1962), Russian musician
Wolfgang Seidel (1926-1987), German racing driver

See also 
Seidl, a surname
Seydel, a surname
Seidell, a surname
Siedel, a surname
Zajdel (disambiguation), Polonized version

References

German-language surnames
Surnames of German origin
Surnames from given names